Conlig railway station was on the Belfast and County Down Railway which ran from Belfast to Donaghadee in Northern Ireland.

History

The station was opened by the Belfast and County Down Railway on 1 October 1861.

The station closed to passengers on 1 June 1865.

References 

 
 
 

Disused railway stations in County Down
Railway stations opened in 1861
Railway stations closed in 1865
1861 establishments in Ireland
1865 disestablishments in Ireland
Railway stations in Northern Ireland opened in the 19th century